A secure attention key (SAK) or secure attention sequence (SAS) is a special key or key combination to be pressed on a computer keyboard before a login screen which must, to the user, be completely trustworthy. The  operating system kernel, which interacts directly with the hardware, is able to detect whether the secure attention key has been pressed. When this event is detected, the kernel starts the trusted login processing.

The secure attention key is designed to make login spoofing impossible, as the kernel will suspend any program, including those masquerading as the computer's login process, before starting a trustable login operation.

Examples 
Some examples are:
  for Windows NT.
  default sequence for Linux. Not a true C2-compliant SAK.

See also
 Control-Alt-Delete
 Magic SysRq key
 Break key

References

Computer security procedures
Computer access control